The Blue Ridge Mountains Council is a Boy Scouts of America council located in Roanoke, Virginia, that serves Scouts in southwest and south central Virginia.  The Blue Ridge Mountains Council owns and operates the Blue Ridge Scout Reservation in Pulaski County, Virginia, the largest Council-owned Scout reservation in the United States.  The council's Tutelo Lodge is part of the Order of the Arrow.

History  
The council was formed in 1972, following the merger of the former Piedmont and Blue Ridge councils into one consolidated council serving 21 counties. The Piedmont Council's headquarters had been in Lynchburg, Virginia, and after the merger the Blue Ridge Council's headquarters in Roanoke, Virginia, became the merged council's headquarters for its 13,562 members. The Associated Press reported that a key factor for the merger was the availability of the large Blue Ridge Scout Reservation and the Piedmont Council's sale of its old Camp Monocan for $190,000.

The Council developed the "Appomattox Court House Historic Trail" in 1972 at Appomattox Court House, Virginia, led by longtime volunteer Scouter, Dr. Charles Hansrote Jr., then-chairman of the Chemistry Department at Lynchburg College. A memorable highlight was the council's participation in the United States Bicentennial celebrations of 1976. In a Council-wide event, Scouts gathered to re-enact Gen. Nathanael Greene's retreat across the Dan River during the Revolutionary War. The Danville Register & Bee said the 3-day re-enactment was performed "with surprising detail" in depicting the Continental Army's successful crossing of the river in February, 1781, "to escape the Redcoats of Lord Charles Cornwallis".

In 2015, the council was required by the Virginia Department of Conservation and Recreation to rebuild a dam and spillway on a lake at its Camp Powhatan. Working with the Virginia Department of Game and Inland Fisheries, Pulaski County, Appalachian Power, and the Friends of Claytor Lake, the council had approximately 400 tons (400,000 kg) of concrete debris removed to nearby Claytor Lake for improved fish habitat at the  reservoir. Saying that Scouting is interested in sustainability, the Council Executive said that the expected increase in the lake's fish population of perch and bass will benefit fishermen, many of whom are former Scouts themselves. "Every Boy Scout and every Cub Scout learns how to fish", he said.

Organization 
The council is part of Area 7 of the Southern Region of the BSA. The council has over 470 units sponsored by over 300 community organizations.  BRMC is divided into six districts:

 Great Valley District
 Dan River District
 Mountain Empire District
 New River District
 Patrick Henry District
 Piedmont District

Camps

"Old" Camp Powhatan
The Blue Ridge Council's original Camp Powhatan was located between Lexington, Virginia, and Roanoke near Natural Bridge and the Jefferson National Forest. In the 1920s–1930s, the council made the property available to Washington and Lee University for an unusual freshman orientation program. Held on a September weekend following the end of Scout summer camp, the popular 3-day camping program for incoming freshmen included sports such as baseball and swimming, along with university-led discussions about campus life and course selection, as a prelude to the regular on-campus student orientation.

Blue Ridge Scout Reservation

Blue Ridge Scout Reservation is located in Pulaski County, Virginia on a  property, almost 7% of the total county area. The reservation also stretches into small parts of Montgomery, Floyd, and Carroll counties. It is the largest council-owned Scout Reservation in the United States and provides summer camping experiences to over 10,000 participants each summer.

The land's background
After the Civil War's Battle of Cloyd's Mountain near Radford, Virginia, the Union Army pushed farther south. One company stopped for the night on a tract of land on what is now the Blue Ridge Scout Reservation. One of the soldiers who worked for a Philadelphia iron works discovered that the rocks there contained a great deal of iron ore. After the war was over, the employee interested his firm, R.D. Wood and Sons, in the land. The company purchased the tract to establish iron mining there. By 1885, it was a thriving operation. By 1905, it was inactive. It was during this time that the Iron Furnace was built, which would later become the emblematic structure on the Reservation. When the last member of the original family, Walter Wood, died in 1934, he willed the land to Radford College, now Radford University "to be used to the best possible advantage." Radford College chose to sell the land in order to fund a concert organ for its music program. The Virginia General Assembly authorized the sale. The Blue Ridge Mountains Council (Roy Webb, a local of Pulaski, also put in bids for land, and got a little over 300 acres in the sale, including the Iron Furnace, a hiking trail that Mr Webb cut out was named after him, it runs off Dead Pine Mnt) put in the successful bid of $56,100 and acquired the  tract, plus two farms with  combined.

Buildings were constructed along Maxs Creek and an earthen dam was built to form a  lake for swimming. The site was called "New" Camp Powhatan to distinguish it from the council's original camp, "Old" Camp Powhatan. The other base camp, Camp Ottari, was opened in the summer of 1962. After occupying a site leased by the Appalachian Power Company for over 10 years, the Claytor Lake Aquatics Base was established in the summer of 2008.

Camps Ottari and Powhatan

Camp Powhatan is positioned below the Jersey Ridge on the Blue Ridge Scout Reservation and offers Merit Badge instruction in Aquatics on Lake Powhatan, Scoutcraft, Handicraft, Shooting Sports, and Nature, along with a  climbing tower. Camp Ottari is situated between Bench Mountain and North Ridge. The camp encompasses rugged, mountainous terrain, and a large lake. Merit badge instruction is offered in Nature, Handicraft, Scoutcraft, Aquatics, and Shooting Sports. Because of its larger lake, the camp offers Small Boat Sailing through the Ottari Marina. Camp Ottari provides Adult Leader Training in its training center, and features the Little Laurel Woodshop, where Scoutmasters can use traditional hand tools to create woodworking projects. Wood Badge training for adult leaders is conducted at the camp.

Claytor Lake Aquatics Base
The Claytor Lake Aquatics Base is an aquatics base, which opened in the summer of 2008 making it the newest camp on the Blue Ridge Scout Reservation. It is situated on the  Claytor Lake. At the base, Scouts spend the week motor boating, large boat sailing, small boat sailing, water skiing, kayaking, snorkeling, rowing, and wakeboarding. The program offers Scouts the opportunity to participate in an overnighter on a large sailing vessel. Scouts who are age 14 and older can choose to focus on scuba diving. The Base also offers a wakeboarding school. The Claytor Lake Aquatics Base is a provisional program for Scouts aged 13 and older.

High Knoll Trail Adventure

Crews hike during the day, and make camp at one of a series of outposts in the evening. At the outposts, activities such as rock-climbing, blacksmithing, and rifle shooting are offered. Based out of Camp Ottari, the program attracts out-of-state participants and has been compared to a Philmont-like experience for Scouts. The Daily Advocate newspaper, in reporting on a group of Ohio Explorers traveling to the Virginia camp to participate in the High Knoll Trail program, described it as a "rugged outdoor adventure ... of back-packing and trail camping" on the six-day trek. In 2000, visiting Boy Scouts from Pennsylvania set a record for the trail at the time, hiking 68 miles (100 km) in five days. Backpackers must be at least 13 years old  and at least 1st Class rank by June 1st to participate in High Knoll.

 Huff Farm — offers experience on a working horse ranch. Scouts learn skills in roping and horsemanship. A trail ride is offered, and a Chili dinner is served in the evening.
 Rendezvous — Participants learn to use a black-powder rifle, throw tomahawks and knives, and develop skills that enabled settlers to survive the frontier of the Blue Ridge Mountains.
 Wild Goose — Participants learn basic skills and gain experience in Mountainboarding.
 Point Camp — offers bouldering, rock climbing, and rappelling on a natural rock face.

New River Adventure
The New River Adventure is a high adventure program for older Scouts, based at Camp Powhatan. The program includes the BSA's COPE ("Challenging Outdoor Personal Experience") activities, such as ropes courses, natural rock climbing,  spelunking in the area's limestone caves, and mountaineering. During the week, participants take a 3-day whitewater rafting trip on the Class I-V rapids of the New River Gorge National River.

Voyageur Trek
The Voyageur Trek is a canoeing program, in which participants embark on a five-day,  canoe trip on the Roanoke River. Throughout the program, Scouts learn about the French Canadian Voyageurs that forged the first paths in the New World. During the trek, Scouts hone paddling skills, learn to read whitewater, fish the waters of the New River, and go whitewater rafting in the New River Gorge. The Voyageur trek is a provisional program, and Scouts must be 13 years old by January 1 to participate.

Fish Camp
Fish Camp is a provisional program based out of Camp Powhatan which instructs Scouts in the skills of fishing and fly-fishing. Throughout the week, area anglers instruct Scouts about the environment and biology that influences fish behavior. Participants fish in the lakes and rivers on, and surrounding, the Blue Ridge Scout Reservation. This program is renowned for its float trip on the New River, and fly-fishing trip beneath the waterfalls of the Cascades. Fish Camp is a provisional program, offering leadership for Scouts aged 13 years and older.

Mountain Man

Mountain Man is a provisional program located in the Laurel Hollow on the Blue Ridge Scout Reservation. Daniel Boone's Wilderness Road is located several miles from the encampment. Participants experience Appalachian Virginia by learning the skills of the 18th century woodsmen that settled in the area. Scouts dress in period clothing and participate in shooting muzzle-loading black-powder rifles, building fires using flint and steel, blacksmithing, leather working, throwing tomahawks and knives, cooking, and wilderness survival. Scouts from as far away as Florida have participated.

Brownsea Island
The Brownsea Island Adventure is a summer camp program designed to help younger Scouts learn the patrol method, and develop basic Scout skills. It is offered at both base camps Powhatan and Ottari. Scouts are divided into groups of 8-10 boys, and paired with a Life or Eagle Scout who serves as their guide. Participants learn the essential skills of Scouting, and complete many of the requirements for Tenderfoot through First Class through interactive lessons, daily competitions, and a hike.

Camp Tye Brook and Camp Bolton Smith
The Piedmont Council once ran two camps near Lynchburg, Camp Tye Brook and Camp Bolton Smith. Both closed in 1940 due to water contamination. Camp Bolton Smith was name after, Bolton Smith, who had worked to promote expanding Scouting in the African American community.

Program and activities
Foxfire is the name of the National Youth Leadership Training course offered by the council. The NYLT course develops Scouts into trained troop leaders, by focusing on the concepts of what a leader must be, what he must know, and what he must do. Scouts are divided into patrols and participate in the Quest for the Meaning of Leadership. Participants experience presentations, activities and patrol competitions. Foxfire is a provisional program where participants must be 13 years old and First Class by the beginning of the Program to participate.

Order of the Arrow

The council's Order of the Arrow program is represented by Tutelo Lodge 161. The name reflects the small Tutelo Indian tribe that once inhabited the area. On its website, the Lodge traces its origin to the merger on January 1, 1973, of the former Blue Ridge Council's Powhatan Lodge 456 and Koo Koo Ku Hoo Lodge 161 of the old Piedmont Council, combined after the two Councils merged. Koo Koo Ku Hoo Lodge's predecessor is said to have begun in 1939 as Ne-Pah-Win Lodge 161, at a camp in Nelson County.

See also
 Scouting in Virginia

References 

Local councils of the Boy Scouts of America
Southern Region (Boy Scouts of America)
Youth organizations based in Virginia